The Sibe language may refer to:
Xibe language in Xinjiang, China
Nagovisi language in Bougainville, PNG